William Beckford may refer to:

 William Beckford (politician) (1709–1770), English businessman and slave-owner, often called "Alderman Beckford"
 William Beckford (novelist) (1760–1844), his son, English novelist, art collector, travel writer and politician
 William Beckford of Somerley (1744–1799), Jamaican slave-owner and writer